My Kind of Country may refer to:
My Kind of Country (Reba McEntire album), 1984
My Kind of Country (Van Zant album), 2007
My Kind of Country (TV series), a Canadian country music television series
My Kind of Country Music, a 1965 studio album by Hank Locklin